USS Joseph Hewes (AP-50/APA-22), formerly SS Excalibur, was a troop transport for the United States Navy during World War II commanded by Captain Robert McLanhan Smith Jr. A part of the Center Attack Group of Admiral Hewitt's Western Naval Task Force, Operation Torch, Joseph Hewes was sunk on November 11, 1942 by the German submarine U-173 in Fedala Roads off French Morocco coast during the Naval Battle of Casablanca.

Pre-war history
She was built by the New York Shipbuilding Corporation, and launched in 1930 in Camden, New Jersey as the combination passenger-cargo luxury liner SS Excalibur. One of American Export Lines "4 Aces" sister ships — SS Excalibur, SS Exeter, SS Excambion and SS Exochorda — she provided regular service between New York and Europe. SS Excalibur departed on her maiden voyage on January 24, 1931, sailing from New York City to Marseilles, Naples, Alexandria, Jaffa, Haifa, Beirut, and then turning back and stopping at Alexandria, Naples, Leghorn, Genoa, Marseilles and finally reaching New York. In August 1940, Excalibur carried the Duke and Duchess of Windsor from Lisbon to Bermuda, where she stopped on a special call.

On January 8, 1942, Excalibur was acquired by the U.S. Navy and assigned the task of transporting troops to and from battle areas as an AP-class troop transport. She was commissioned on May 1, 1942 as USS Joseph Hewes (AP-50). Her sister ships were also converted for war purposes; out of all original "4 Aces" only the SS Exochorda survived the war.

World War II 
After conversion and fitting out, Joseph Hewes sortied from Hampton Roads on October 24, 1942 as part of the Center Attack Group of Admiral Hewitt's Western Naval Task Force en route to French Morocco as part of Operation Torch. She was carrying 80 officers and 1,074 men of the reinforced 3rd Infantry Division, U.S. Army, plus ammunition and supplies.

The transport arrived off Fedhala on November 8, by 0705 hours, landed all troops, and then commenced unloading ammunition and supplies. By November 11, Joseph Hewes had completed cargo unloading and had received 30 casualties from the beach fire.

Sinking 
At 1950 hours she took a torpedo hit in No. 2 hold from U-173. The ship settled by the bow and began filling rapidly with water. Captain Smith endeavored to pick up anchor or slip chain but, as the entire forecastle was under water, this was not possible. He then attempted to beach the ship by backing engines but her propeller was out of the water, so the order was given to abandon ship.

Joseph Hewes went down at 2032 hours, taking Captain Smith and approximately 100 seamen with her. U-173 paid heavily for her victory, for she was sunk five days later off Casablanca by American destroyers.

Recognition
USS Joseph Hewes received for her World War II service Combat Action Ribbon (retroactive, 11 November 1942), American Campaign Medal, Europe-Africa-Middle East Campaign Medal with a battle star, as well as World War II Victory Medal. Prior to her loss, Joseph Hewes had been designated for reclassification in early 1943 as an APA-class attack transport, USS Joseph Hewes (APA-22). Her assigned hull numerical sequence, APA-22, was never reissued to another transport ship. In the 1956 Universal International production Away All Boats, the USS Randall (APA-224) wore hull number APA-22 while standing in as the motion picture's fictional USS Belinda.

Captain Robert Mclanahan Smith, Jr., U.S. Naval Academy class of 1919, was posthumously awarded with the Silver Star Medal, the third-highest military decoration for valor awarded to members of the United States Armed Forces. His citation read:

Namesake
The USS Joseph Hewes was named after Joseph Hewes (1730-1779), signer of the Declaration of Independence, who acted as Navy Secretary at the time and supported Navy Captain John Paul Jones, one of the founders of the U.S Navy.

References

External links 
 
 NavSource Online: Service Ship Photo Archive - AP-50 Joseph Hewes
 U.S. Navy Attack transports, Global Security

Ships built by New York Shipbuilding Corporation
1930 ships
Passenger ships of the United States
World War II passenger ships of the United States
World War II auxiliary ships of the United States
Transports of the United States Navy
Ships sunk by German submarines in World War II
Maritime incidents in November 1942